The Headies Award for Rookie of the Year is an award presented at The Headies, a ceremony that was established in 2006 and originally called the Hip Hop World Awards. It was first presented to Dammy Krane and Burna Boy in 2012

Recipients

References 

Rookie of the Year